Jean I may refer to:

Jean I of Arles (died 675), Archbishop of Arles
John I, Count of Ponthieu (c. 1140–1191), son of Guy II of Ponthieu
Jean I de Montfort (died 1249), Comte de Montfort
John I, Duke of Brittany (1217–1286), John the Red, Duke of Brittany
John I, Count of Hainaut (1218–1257), Count of Hainaut 
John I, Count of Auxerre (1243–1309), son of John, Count of Chalon, ruled jointly as Count of Auxerre
John I, Duke of Brabant (c. 1252–1294), Duke of Brabant, Lothier and Limburg
Jean I de Grailly (died c. 1301), seneschal of Duchy of Gascony and Kingdom of Jerusalem
Jean I Le Maingre (c. 1310–1367)
John I of France (born/died 1316), King of France and Navarre, and Count of Champagne for his five days alive
John I, Count of Armagnac (died 1373), Count of Armagnac
Jean I de Croÿ (c. 1365–1415), founder of the House of Croÿ
John I, Duke of Bourbon (1381–1434), Duke of Bourbonand Duke of Auvergne
Jean I, Lord of Monaco (c. 1382 – 1454)
Jean I of Albret (1425–1468)
Jean Bérain the Elder (1640–1711), French draughtsman, designer, painter and engraver
Jean I Restout (1666–1702), French painter, part of Restout family of painters
Jean, Grand Duke of Luxembourg (1921–2019), ruled Luxembourg from 1964 to 2000

See also
John I (disambiguation)
Juan I (disambiguation)

pt:João I